Ara (also Romanized as Arā and Arā’) is a village in Poshtkuh Rural District, Chahardangeh District, Sari County, Mazandaran Province, Iran. At the 2006 census, its population was 384, in 109 families.

References 

Populated places in Sari County